Massilia dura is a Gram-negative, rod-shaped, non-spore-forming bacterium from the genus Massilia and family Oxalobacteraceae, which was isolated with Massilia albidiflava, Massilia plicata, and Massilia lutea from soil samples collected from southeast China.
Colonies of M. dura are hard and compact and their color is pale white to yellow.

Etymology
The specific name dura comes from the Latin dura, which means "hard", because of the nature of the colonies.

References

External links
Type strain of Massilia dura at BacDive -  the Bacterial Diversity Metadatabase

Burkholderiales